Curtovirus is a genus of ssDNA viruses, in the family Geminiviridae. Dicotyledonous plants serve as natural hosts. Curtoviruses are transmitted by leafhoppers. There are three species in this genus. Diseases associated with this genus include: Curly top disease.

Structure
Viruses in Curtovirus are non-enveloped, with icosahedral geometries, and T=1 symmetry. The diameter is around 22 nm, with a length of 38 nm. Genomes are circular and non-segmented, around 3.0kb in length.

Life cycle
Viral replication is nuclear. Entry into the host cell is achieved by penetration into the host cell. Replication follows the ssDNA rolling circle model. Dna templated transcription is the method of transcription. The virus exits the host cell by nuclear pore export, and  tubule-guided viral movement.
Dicotyledonous plants serve as the natural host. The virus is transmitted via a vector (beet leafhopper). Transmission routes are vector.

References

External links
 Viralzone: Curtovirus
 ICTV

Geminiviridae
Virus genera